2,3-Dichlorophenylpiperazine (2,3-DCPP or DCPP) is a chemical compound from the phenylpiperazine family. It is both a precursor in the synthesis of aripiprazole and one of its metabolites. It is unclear whether 2,3-DCPP is pharmacologically active as a serotonin receptor agonist similar to its close analogue 3-chlorophenylpiperazine (mCPP), though it has been shown to act as a partial agonist of the dopamine D2 and D3 receptors.

Legality
2,3-DCPP has been made illegal in Japan and Hungary after having been identified in seized designer drug samples.

List of derivatives
Aripiprazole
Cariprazine
BAK 2-66
Brilaroxazine (formally RP-5063)
FAUC-365 [474432-66-1]
CJB-090 2xHCl [595584-40-0]
NGB 2849 [189061-11-8]
NGB 2904 Fb: [189061-11-8] HCl: [189060-98-8]
PG-01037 2xHCl: [675599-62-9]
PG648
Aripiptranyl (Abilifarnate)

PGX-2000001 
So-called R-22
So-called JJC 7−065
R-PG-648

Positional Isomer
The positional isomer 3,4-dichlorophenylpiperazine (3,4-DCPP) is also known, and acts as both a serotonin releaser via the serotonin transporter, and a β1-adrenergic receptor blocker, though with relatively low affinity at both targets.

Triple Substituted
Such 3,4,5-Trisubstituted aromatic entities is already known from clenbuterol. Leading to CID:151687078  (Ex 6 is a concrete example of this) i.e. 1-(4-Amino-3,5-dichlorophenyl)-4-(4-phthalimido-1- butyl)piperazine.

See also 
 Substituted piperazine
 Phenylpiperazine

References

External links